Theodore Edward Davis (October 29, 1898 – June 1970) was an American football, basketball, and baseball coach. He served as the head football coach at Salem University in Salem, West Virginia from 1930 to 1941, where he was also instrumental in founding the West Virginia Intercollegiate Athletic Conference. The gymnasium at Salem is named in his honor.

Davis died in Massachusetts in June 1970, at the age of 71.

References

External links
 Salem Hall of Fame profile

1898 births
1970 deaths
Salem Tigers athletic directors
Salem Tigers baseball coaches
Salem Tigers football coaches
Salem Tigers football players
Salem Tigers men's basketball coaches